Colonel William Francis Frederick Waller VC (20 August 1839 – 29 January 1885) was a recipient of the Victoria Cross, the highest and most prestigious award for gallantry in the face of the enemy that can be awarded to British and Commonwealth forces.

Details

Waller was born at Dagoolie, India, on 20 August 1839. He was the son of Thomas Waller & his wife Alicia Ann née Gilbert. He married Mary Anna Grierson on 16 June 1864 at Bombay, India.

Waller was eighteen years old, and a lieutenant in the 25th Bombay Light Infantry during the Indian Mutiny. On 20 June 1858 at Gwalior, British India, Waller and another officer who was killed during the action, Lieutenant Rose, were the only Europeans present at the storming of the Gwalior Fort. With a handful of men they organised a surprise attack by night on the fort, climbing onto the roof of a house, shooting the gunners who opposed them, and, after hand-to-hand fighting, taking the fort, killing everyone in it. Rose was killed, but for his part in the action Waller was awarded the Victoria Cross. His citation read:

However, the award was not gazetted until 25 February 1862.

He later achieved the rank of colonel. He died at Bath, Somerset, on 29 January 1885 and is buried there in the Locksbrook Cemetery. His VC is on display in the Lord Ashcroft Gallery at the Imperial War Museum, London.

Family
Waller married and had children, including Frederick Charles Livingston Waller.

References

External links

Location of grave and VC medal biographical details (Avon)
VC medal auction details

1839 births
1885 deaths
British recipients of the Victoria Cross
Bombay Staff Corps officers
British East India Company Army officers
Indian Rebellion of 1857 recipients of the Victoria Cross
Indian Political Service officers